Practical joker may refer to:

 Someone who plays a practical joke, setting up a situation to produce a humorous physical outcome at the expense of a target
 "The Practical Joker", an episode of the animated television series Star Trek
 Practical Jokers, a 1938 comedy short film
 "The Practical Joker", an episode of The Adventures of Ozzie and Harriet
 "The Practical Joker", an episode of Zorro (1957 TV series)
 "The Practical Joker", an episode of The Hathaways
 "The Practical Joker", an episode of Deadly Games

See also
 Comedian (disambiguation)
 Comic (disambiguation)
 Impractical Joker (disambiguation)
 Joker (disambiguation)
 Jester (disambiguation)
 Jokester (disambiguation)
 Prankster (disambiguation)